Pakui Hardware is a Lithuanian artist duo, composed of Neringa Černiauskaite and Ugnius Gelguda since 2014.

Bibliography 

 
 
 
 

Lithuanian artists
Art duos